Phil Wynd (born 23 January 1946) is a former  Australian rules footballer who played with Hawthorn in the Victorian Football League (VFL). Wynd's career spanned from 1965 to 1967 and played 11 games of football. His jumper number was 36.

Notes

External links 

Living people
1946 births
Australian rules footballers from Victoria (Australia)
Hawthorn Football Club players